Tung Kong Chow Gar Tong Long (East River Chow Family Praying Mantis), or simply Chow Gar (周家), is a southern Chinese martial art of the Hakka (客家) people. It is one of the four major schools in Southern Praying Mantis, the other schools being Chu Gar (朱家; Chu Family), Kwong Sai Jook Lum (江西竹林; JiangXi Bamboo Forest), and Tit Ngau (鐵牛; Iron Ox). It is an aggressive style with an emphasis on close-range fighting. These skills are developed by utilizing a range of training techniques that have been developed over several centuries.

This style is not related to Jow-Ga Kung Fu(), a southern Chinese martial art founded by Jow Lung in the early 1900s. It is also not related to the Northern Praying Mantis systems such as 7 Star Praying Mantis (七星螳螂拳), Plum Blossom Praying Mantis (梅花螳螂拳), Taiji Praying Mantis (太極螳螂拳) etc.

Introduction

History 
The history of Chow Gar Praying Mantis was transmitted orally with little supporting documentation until the 1900s. The origins of Chow Gar are similar to other martial arts of the Hakka community with references to the Southern Shaolin monastery and exploits centered around Southern China. Information prior to the turn of the century is speculative at best. In the modern era, Lau Soei is recognized by both the Chow Gar and Chu Gar practitioners as the leading promoter of this style. The leading authorities on Chow Gar are the students of Yip Shui, and their schools can be found worldwide.

Lineage masters of the past

Chow Ah NaamAccording to Chow Gar tradition, the founder of the style was Chow Ah Naam who lived in the 1800s. He had spent many years in the Southern Shaolin Monastery under the guidance of the abbot Sim See Yan. He created a new style which he called Praying Mantis after watching a fight between a praying mantis and a bird. His style is not related to the Northern Praying Mantis created by Wang Lang during the Song Dynasty (960–1279). Ah Naam taught the style to many people in the region and one of his students was Wong Fook Go.

Wong Fook GoWong Fook Go was initially a layperson but later became a traveling monk. He travelled throughout Southern China including Wai Yearn village in the area of Tung Kung (East River).

Lau Soei (1866–1942)

Lau Soei was an accomplished teacher of the martial arts in his home village of Wai Yearn (HuiYang) in GuangDong Province, Southern China, before meeting Wong Fook Go. Oral traditions suggested that Lau challenged Wong and was soundly defeated by Wong. Lau then became a student of Wong and became proficient in the Chow Gar Southern Praying Mantis. Using this knowledge, he further enhanced his reputation and earned the nickname "Number one of the three tigers of Dong Jiang".

In 1913, Lau Soei moved to Hong Kong and established a Southern Praying Mantis school in Kowloon. Initially, he would teach his system only to members of the Hakka community. Near the end of his career, he opened his teachings to the general public. Yip Shui was one of his first non-Hakka students. Lau Soei died in 1942.

Yip Shui (1912–2004)

Yip Shui continued the tradition of Lau Soei after living and training extensively with Lau Soei. He established a reputation for the effectiveness of the Chow Gar style by meeting all challenges. He worked hard to teach and promote this style. Yip Shui died in 2004.

Masters currently teaching in Hong Kong
After the passing of Grandmaster Yip Shui in 2004, the legacy of Tung Kong Chow Gar Southern Mantis Kung Fu continues to be taught and passed down to future generations. Listed below are some of the masters who are currently teaching this system in Hong Kong:

 Yip Chee Keung (葉志強), the son of Yip Shui, continues the family tradition as the inheritor Gatekeeper Grandmaster of this system. Chee Keung emigrated to London, England in the 1970s. He established a Chow Gar Southern Mantis School there. Yip Chee Keung currently resides in Hong Kong but regularly travels abroad to teach in Hungary and the UK.
 Ng Si Kay, Yip Shui's son in law, is the current head instructor for Chow Gar Mantis Association (International) based in Hong Kong.
 Li Tin Loi, a student of Yip Shui, teaches at the Hong Kong Tong Kong Chow Ka-Praying Mantis Li Tin Loi Martial Arts Association. In recent years, master Li has joined together with other masters of Hakka Kung Fu to form the Hakka Kung Fu and Culture Research Society, with the aim to preserve and promote the traditions of the Hakka Martial Arts and culture such as Unicorn KeiLun/Qilin dance.
 Ng Woon Hang, a student of Yip Shui, teaches at the Chow Gar Mantis Kung Fu Association in Mong Kok.

Masters around the world

In the United Kingdom, Paul Whitrod started his training in Chow Gar Praying Mantis at the age of 15 with Yip Chee Keung at his school in 1975. Paul later visited and trained in Hong Kong where he stayed at Grandmaster Yip Shui's home and became a 'closed-door' student, learning the finer details of the system and traditional Dit Dar medicine. In the fall of 1986 Paul Whitrod opened his first full-time school in London, and the following year invited his Yip Shui Sigung and Yip Chee Keung Sifu to London. It was at this time they made Sifu Whitrod the UK representative of Chow Gar Praying Mantis Kung Fu. Sifu Paul continues to teach at his school in Stratford, London and has taught many students over the years, many of whom have gone on to spread the art in other countries, including Italy, Switzerland, Germany, Ireland, Greece, and America.

Chow Gar Mantis Australian Representative Paul Brennan, an original student of Yip Chee Keung & his father Yip Shui, is now a closed door student of Master Ng Si Kay and currently has branches in Queensland, Australia.

Chow Gar Tong Long Hungary branch has a strong following with many dedicated students. The school is led by Sifu Bálint Vitárius, who started his martial arts studies in 1996. He has been learning directly from Grandmaster Ip Chee Keung, the head of the system, since 2005.

In the United States, one of Yip Shui's first-generation students, Ngai Piu Tan, went to New York City in the late 1950s to 1960 in search of opportunity. He started to teach Praying Mantis and by chance one of his kung fu brothers from Hong Kong also landed in New York and had a location for him to teach in New York's Manhattan Chinatown, where the exclusive club remains to this day. Over the years other students of Yip Shui slowly made their way to New York City. During the 1970s, Lee Kwun, Yip's brother-in-law and one of his earliest students, emigrated to New York and took over the Chow Gar Praying Mantis club and continues to head it today, despite his advanced age. Today the club remains in its original location and is the first and oldest club in the country.

Forms

There are many different forms in the Chow Gar system and each instructor may teach a variety of forms. In addition to the solo forms, there are also numerous pair forms for empty hand and weapons, and many two-person drills (樁; Chong) to train techniques, sensitivity and power.

The names for some of the solo forms found in the system include:

Core fist forms (拳種) 
Chow Gar Tong Long has a core set of basic forms that all instructors from different schools and lineages teach. The first 3 forms are known as the 拳種 or seed forms of the system and are usually the first 3 forms taught to beginner students to get them familiar with the correct mantis structure and shape. The next two forms in the list are also commonly taught by every school.

 Sarm Bo Jin (三步箭; 3 step arrow)
 Sarm Jin Yiu Kiu (三箭搖橋; 3 arrows shaking bridge)
 Sarm Jin Pai Kiu (三箭批橋; 3 arrows shave/slice bridge)
 Sarm Gong Pin Kiu aka. Sarm Gong Bik Kiu (三弓片橋/三弓迫橋; 3 bows slicing bridge/3 bows pressing bridge)
 Fut Sau (佛手; Buddhist hand)

Intermediate forms (中級) 
Chow Gar Tong Long has a modular syllabus, the names and order of forms may vary depending on the instructor. Some of these intermediate level forms have relatively short sequences and can be trained in combination with other sections. Here are the names for some of these forms:

 Yum Yeung Kum Na Sau (陰陽擒拿手; Yin Yang Seizing Hands) aka. Yum Yeung Tow Jeung (陰陽吐掌; Yin Yang Spitting Palms)
 Sup Jee Kau Da Sau (十字扣打手; Ten character continuous striking hands)
 Law Suen Sau (螺旋手; Spiral Hands)
 Banging on the Drum (tbc)
 Tow Mow Sau (吐霧手; Spitting Mist)
 Seong Tow Sau (雙吐手; Double Spitting hands)
 Pao Tow Fist (拋吐拳)
 Leep Kiu (獵橋, Hunting the bridge)
 Gau Si Mun sau (tbc; 9 seeking/asking hands)
 Mo Ying Sau (無影手; No Shadow hands)
 Chor Kui (挫橋; Smashing/Breaking the bridge)
 Say Ban Gen Tan (四板驚彈; 4 directional/side shock power)
 Gen Tan Geng Sau (驚彈勁手; shock power hand)

Advanced forms (高級) 
Here are the names of some of these later advanced forms:

 Second/Third Level Sarm Bo Jin (二級/三級三步箭)
 Poon loong keok (蟠龍腳; Coiling/Rolling Dragon Leg)
 Sup Baat Yau Loong Sau (十八游龍手; 18 Swimming Dragon Hands)
 Bic Saan Quan (迫山拳; Pressing/Forcing the Mountain Fist)
 Chin Si Sau (纏絲手; Silk Reeling Hands)
 Dai Siu Lin Wan Sau (大小連環手; Big & Small Continuous Linking Circular hands)
 Bo Sim Sau (螳螂捕蟬手; Mantis Searching Insect Hand)
 Say Mun Sau (四門手; Four Gates Hand)
 Hall of Light Steps

Qi Gong/Hay Gung Sets (氣功) 
There are many internal energy (hay gung) exercises found in the system, which can be broadly put into 3 categories: 1/ exercises for maintaining health (養生功; yern sun gong), 2/ exercises for protecting the body from physical attacks (護體功; wu tai gong), 3/ exercises for developing the body and power for fighting (博擊功; bok gik gong).

Here are the names of some of the key sets:

 18 Um Gen Sau (十八暗勁手; 18 hidden power hands)
 Hap Jeung Gong (合掌功; Clamping palm)
 Hoot Sar Jeung (血沙掌; Blood Sand palm)
 But Saan Gong (拔山功; Lifting the mountain)
 Seated QiGong and Meditation

Weapons (兵器) 
The main weapon of choice in Chow Gar Tong Long is the long pole, the 'Dan Tau Gwun' or single headed long pole. This type of pole is typically around 7ft 2, and is tapered.

The long pole forms include:
 Ng Hang Gwun (五行棍; 5 Element Pole)
 Dook Sair Gwun (毒蛇棍; Poison Snake Pole)
 Bo Sim Gwun (捕蟬棍; Catching Cicada Pole)
 Lau Seoi Gwun (劉水棍; Master Lau Soei's pole form)
 Wong Ngau Chin Joi Gwun (黃牛鑽咀棍; Yellow Cow Twisting Tongue)

Other weapons include:
 Wu Dip Sheung Do (蝴蝶雙刀; butterfly knives aka double knives)
 Tit Chek (鐵尺; Iron rulers aka Sai)
 Yau Loong Gim aka. Tong Long Joi Fung Gim (遊龍劍/螳螂追風劍; Swimming Dragon / Mantis Chasing Wind Sword) 
 Dan Do (單刀; Broadsword)
 Dai Paa (大耙; Trident/Tiger fork) 
 Hakka Til (客家挑 / 雙頭棍; Double headed stick)
 Tit Jim (鐡針; Metal Needle/Spear)
 Walking Stick
 Umbrella (螳螂傘)

Weapons Pair work (軍械對拆):
 Pole vs Pole (棍對棍, "Gwun doi Gwun")
 Pole vs Tit Chek 
 Empty hand vs Butterfly Knives
 Spear vs Broadsword and Shield

Techniques

Basic movements (散手)
In 1965, Grandmaster Ip Shui published his famous book "Mantis Boxing Basic Techniques" (螳螂拳散手; Tong Long Quan San Sau), wherein he described the history of the style along with explanations and instructions for some of the most common basic techniques (散手; san sau) and fundamental training methods found within the system.

There are at least 36 basic movements consisting of one or 3 moves, known as San Sau. They include:

 1/ Bow Chong (包樁; cover hand, meaning to wrap up)
 2/ Gau Choi (絞槌; hammer fist to come down)
 3/ Yui Sau (搖手; shake off hand)
 4/ Chuen Sau (傳手; transmit hand)
 5/ Cye Sau (拪手; deflect hand)
 6/ Narp Sau (押手; pressing hand)
 7/ Saw Sau (鎖手; lock hand)
 8/ Man Dan Sau (掹單手; single pull and punch hand)
 9/ Doa Sau (抖手; spring hand)
 10/ Kum La Sau aka. Kum La Ja Jook (擒拿手; seize and hold hand)
 11/ Kum Jin Sau (擒箭手; seizing arrow hand, meaning to grab and attack)
 12/ Ying Kum Sau (鷹擒手; eagle seizing hand)
 13/ Got Sau (割手; cut back hand)
 14/ Kok Choi (角槌; angular fist)
 15/ Suet Sau aka. Mut Sau (扌雪手; sweeping/cleaning hand)
 16/ Yong Sau (?手;upward reach hand/upward testing hand)
 17/ Pai Sau (批手; slicing hand)
 18/ Chum Chung sau (沉掙手; sinking elbow hand)
 19/ Lim Chung sau (拈掙手; elbow picking hand)
 20/ Dun Chung (墩掙; backward elbow)
 21/ Tai Sau (帶手; pulling/carrying hand)
 22/ Chup Sau (插手; straight thrusting hand)
 23/ Yum Yearn Kum Sau (陰陽冚手; yin yang cover hand)
 24/ Jor Yau Biu Sau (左右標手; left & right finger thrusting hand)

 25/ Din Sau (鼎手; rivet/raising support/tripod hand, *a "din" is an ancient Chinese 3 legged ceremonial cauldron)
 26/ Jin Sau (剪手; scissor/shearing hand)
 27/ Soc Sau (索手; shock pulling hand)
 28/ Lau Sau (漏手; leaking hand)
 29/ Deng Choi (釘槌; nailing hook punch)
 30/ Cheet Jeung (切掌; cutting palm strike)
 31/ Yum Yearn Yuet Jeung (陰陽乙掌; yin yang palms)
 32/ Pin Chung (掽掙; forward bumping elbow)

Other techniques not mentioned in the book:
 Noi Choi fun sau (aka Fun Sau) (分手; splitting hand)
 Larp Sau (?手; snatch hand)
 Kwor Sau (?手; circle over hand)
 Pik Sau (辟手; ? hand)
 Jin Choi (箭槌; straight arrow punch)
 Siep Choi (?槌; "to slip in" punch)
 Pin Kiu (片橋; slicing bridge)
 Chor Kiu (挫橋; smashing bridge)

Fundamental Training Methods
 Chy Sau (搓手; grinding hand)
 Doy Chong (對樁; double arm training)
 Sarm Bo Jin (三步箭; 3 step arrows)

(Contributor's note: Many of the names listed for these san sau techniques are Cantonese/Hakka colloquial words used to describe either the motion or the shape of the technique, they do not necessarily make much sense when translated literally unless one actually knows the technique and its application. 
E.g. The technique Saw Sau (鎖手) is used to attack, divert and parry a strike away to the side, and is translated as "lock hand" due to the hand and forearm positions resembling the shape of a key, rather than being a type of joint lock/submission technique.
Hopefully, by presenting the technique's original Chinese name alongside the translation will give some additional insight, depth and understanding for practitioners training this system.)

Training methods
The Chow Gar Tong Long system has numerous training methods for both solo and partner training. There are a few very important exercises that every practitioner of Chow Gar Tong Long must train from the beginning and then continue to train constantly and consistently, even in the advanced levels. These are Saam Bo Gin, Chy Sau, Doi Chong and Chuen Saan Gap.

Saam Bo Gin (三步箭) 
Saam Bo Gin (三步箭) means 3-step arrow, it is the first and most important form that is learnt in the system. It develops all the foundations required to progress in this system, and training in this form never stops.

Chy Sau (搓手) 
Chy Sau (搓手; grinding hands aka "grinding arm"), this exercise is trained with a partner and aims to develop the power of the body into the arms and the bridge.

There are several variations of this exercise with emphasis on different aspects of training.

Doi Chong (對樁) 
Doi Chong (對樁; paired drills) are exercises that take the energy that is developed from Saam Bo Gin and Chy Sau and teaches how to release the power onto a partner, and also how to receive the incoming attack, both while keeping balance and with the correct structure and shape.

The exercises are initially done with both arms together, "Seong Chong" (雙樁; double arm drill), and then progresses to alternating single arm "Dan Chong" (單樁; single arm drill) which is done with increasing resistance, speed and intensity. Eventually, every technique within the system can be trained in this format as a paired drill (對樁; doi chong).

There are many partner drills in this system that are used to help train different techniques, conditioning, sensitivity and power. They include:

 Seong Chong (雙樁; double arm drill) 
 Dan Chong (單樁; single arm drill)
 Lim Chung Chong (拈掙樁; elbow Pick drill, aka. 篩手絞搥樁 cye say gau choi chong)
 Gau Choi Chong (絞搥樁; hammer fist drill)
 Hoi Kui Chong (開橋樁; opening the bridge drill)
 Sheung Toi Chong (上退樁; advance and retreat drill) 
 Maan Dan Sak Kiu (掹單殺橋; single pull and punch kill the bridge drill)
 Sher Ying Shu Bo (蛇形鼠步; snake shape rat steps)
 etc...

Chuen Saan Gap (穿山甲) 
Chuen Saan Gap (穿山甲; Drill through the Mountain Armour/Pangolin) is a type of press up where you dive into the ground and then back up again, the shape resembles that of the Pangolin animal when it burrows into the ground, hence the name. As this practice advances in later stages, this can be done on the fingertips with the hands in the shape of a claw, and also one-handed. Over time, this exercise can develop tremendous strength into the fingers, elbows and arms.

Special Skills and Characteristics of the Style
All martial art styles will have their own unique flavour and special set of skills that distinguish them from other systems. The Chow Gar Praying Mantis also has some unique skills which aim to give the practitioner an advantage during a physical confrontation. Some of these skills are described below:

Shock/Scared Power (驚彈勁)
The short-range power that can translate into shock power or scared power is a basic characteristic of this style. According to legend, this technique was created when founder Chow Ah Naam saw a praying mantis fighting off a blackbird using quick sudden movements.

In the Chow gar Tong Long system, there are three stages of achieving this type of power. The initial stage is referred to as "cho ging" or rough unrefined natural power and strength. The second stage is a type of refined and trained controllable power called "um ging" or hidden power. The final stage is the shock power "geng tan ging".

Four Directional/Plane Power (四板勁)
This skill trains the techniques so that within each movement, the power is never only in one single direction or plane, but in multiple directions. Essentially this skill allows the defence and offence to be combined into one movement.

Golden Bell Shroud/Iron Shirt (金鐘罩/鐵布衫)
This type of skill is to condition the whole body to become hard as iron, so that it is able to withstand strikes from an opponent. To achieve this skill, there are various Qi-Gong sets that are trained alongside physical hitting drills, and then the correct traditional dit-dar herbal medicine must be applied to the area or ingested. All areas of the body are included, beginning with the arms, hands, feet, legs, hips, waist, back, chest, body, neck, head, etc. In the later advanced stages, the special exercises allow even the weak pressure points to be trained and closed off to prevent injuries.

This training requires a gradual step-by-step process and cannot be rushed, there must be proper supervision by a qualified master or else there is a risk of causing internal injuries to the body.

Sun Sook Gong (Testicle Retraction)
This skill trains the body to suck the testicles into the abdomen so that during a fight, the testicles cannot be kicked or grabbed.
There are a number of unique Qi-Gong exercises specifically to train this skill.

Principles and theory

There are many poems and maxims found within the Chow Gar Tong Long system, these poems aim to help the student understand how the system works, and how they should train and practice. Here are some of them.

Morality and ethics

學仁學義學功夫

遵親遵師遵教訓

 學仁學義學功夫 - Hok Yan, Hok Yee, Hok Kung Fu; Learn to be kind, humble and practice Kung Fu.
 遵親遵師遵教訓 - Jun Chun, Jun Si, Jun Gow Fun; Respect your family, teachers and their rightful teachings.

Poems and maxims
Each style has its own requirements on the body structure for application, which are expressed by the body, hands and steps. The Chow Gar Tong Long system has some special characteristics regarding its body structure that are passed down in these poems.
 
Contributor's Note: Some of these poems are incredibly difficult to translate into English. In Chinese, there are often multiple layers of hidden meanings behind each phrase depending on the level of understanding. The translations presented here are the literal surface-level meanings only. Where possible, I have annotated some notes alongside to give some context to the translation. These translations will be updated when new insight and understanding is gained, and validation from masters of this art, this work is in progress...

Characteristics of posture (莊頭) 

懸吊索、擒拿揸捉、
 
千字頭 、蛙仔膝、

筲箕背、鐵尺腰

 懸吊索 - Yuan Diu Sok; suspended sling/hanging noose. (Contributor's Note: This refers to the arms which should be like a suspended noose that suddenly opens and contracts)
 擒拿揸捉 - Kum Na Ja Jook; Seize and catch (Contributor's Note: This refers to the hands which seize, hold and catch the limbs of the opponent).
 千字頭 - Chin Jee Tau; Thousand Character Head (Contributor's Note: This refers to keeping the chin tucked into the neck like the Chinese character for 1,000. This is important for protecting the head and chin during a fight).
 蛙仔膝 - Wa Jai Sut; Young Frog Knees (Contributor's Note: This refers to the legs and knees which should have a springy energy, ready to pounce. It emphasises the importance of sharpness, agility and mobility in the footwork).
 筲箕背 - Sau Gei Bui; Weaved Basket Back (Contributor's Note: This refers to the shape of the upper back being curved or rounded like that of a basket to engage the posterior back muscles and not just the superficial muscles of the arms when applying the techniques).
 鐵尺腰 - Tit Chek Yui; Iron ruler waist (Contributor's Note:This refers to the lower back/waist which must be strong, hard, tough and not broken, this is to connect the lower and top halves of the body as one).

Xin Fa; Principle (心法) 

馬步丁不丁、八不八、

手從心口發、你不來、我不發、

手從心發、法從手出、手去身沉、

橋來橋上過、無橋自造橋、兩橋不歸隨手轉

 馬步丁不丁、八不八 - Maa Bo ding but ding, baat but baat; stance is like a 'T' but not a 'T', like a 'V' but not a 'V'.
 手從心口發 - Sau Chong Sum How Faat; start your hands that come from the heart.
 你不來、我不發 - Lei But Loi, Ngor But Faat; you don't come, I won't start.
 手從心發、法從手出 - Sau Chong Sum Faat, Fat Chong Sau Chut; The hands released from the heart, the method leaves from the hands.
 手去身沉 - Sau Hoi Sun Chum; when the hands go out sink the body.
 橋來橋上過 - Kiu Loi Kui Sheung Gor; if a bridge comes cross over it.
 無橋自造橋 - Mo Kiu Ji Jo Kui; if there is no bridge make a bridge.
 兩橋不歸隨手轉 - Don't retrieve the bridges, but change the hands. (Contributor's Note: This is referring to how the hands upon making contact with the opponent do not need to withdraw to attack again, they can stick to the opponent, to sense, adapt and change according to the situation).

Shen Fa; Body Method/Posture (身法) 
要求沉肩墜肘、吞胸拔背 (含胸拔背)、

吞不能死、吐不能盡、

有吞則吞、無吞則側、

及雙單要醒

 要求沉肩墜肘 - Requirements, the sinking of the shoulders and dropping of the elbows.
 吞胸拔背 - Swallow the chest and curve the back.
 吞不能死, 吐不能盡 - Do not overdo the Swallow and Spit.
 有吞則吞, 無吞則側 - Swallow if it needs to, but if can not swallow turn to the side.
 及雙單要醒 - Get smart on the single and double. (Contributor's Note: This refers to the turning of the body half side on "single" and fully square on "double" and knowing when and why to switch back and forth during a fight).

(Contributor's Note: this poem is difficult to translate or understand without knowledge of kung fu and internal nei-gong practice. There are references to the energy systems of float, swallow, sink and spit and how to cycle through them, with the interaction between the breath and Qi.)

The 5 Large and Small Strengths

五大勁 (Ng Dai Geng; The 5 large strengths):

 腰勁 - Yui Geng; waist power
 馬勁 - Ma Geng; stance or leg power
 橋勁 - Kiu Geng; bridge or arm power
 胸勁 - Hong Geng; chest or torso power
 頭勁 - Tau Geng; head power

五小勁 (Ng Siu Geng; 5 small strengths):

 額勁 - Ngak Geng; Forehead power
 眼勁 - Ngan Geng; Eyes power
 牙勁 - Ngar Geng; Teeth power
 喉勁 - How Geng; Throat power
 頸勁 - Gen Geng; Neck power

(周家螳螂三大鎮山之寳) 

拿龍爪, 拔山功

驚彈勁, 疊骨功

穿山甲, 鐵指功

 拿龍爪 - Nar Loong Jau; dragon seizing claw
 拔山功 - But Saan Gong; lifting the mountain power
 驚彈勁 - Gen Tan Geng; shock power
 疊骨功 - Dip Gwut Gong; Rib bone power
 穿山甲 - Chuen Saan Gap; Pangolin press ups
 鐵指功 - Tit Jee Gong; Iron finger power

See also 
 Southern Praying Mantis

References 

Chinese martial arts
Guangdong Nanquan
Hakka culture

nl:Chow Gar